Events from the year 1838 in art.

Events
 April 8 – The British National Gallery first opens to the public in the building purpose-designed for it by William Wilkins in Trafalgar Square, London.
 August 31 – Scottish-born scene painter David Roberts sets sail for Egypt, with the encouragement of J. M. W. Turner, to produce a series of drawings of the region for use as the basis for paintings and chromolithographs.

Works

 Asher B. Durand – Dance on the Battery in the Presence of Peter Stuyvesant
 Eugène Delacroix 
Convulsionists of Tangiers (completed)
Portrait of Frédéric Chopin and George Sand (unfinished; later separated)
 Louis Meijer – Self-portrait
 Sir David Wilkie
 The Bride at her Toilet
 Our Sovereign, the Queen Victoria, presiding at the Council upon her Majesty's Accession to the Throne, on the 20th June, 1837
 William Wyon – young profile head of Queen Victoria on coins of the pound sterling

Births
 March 28 – Jean-Paul Laurens, painter and sculptor (died 1921)
 May 15 – Nicolae Grigorescu, painter (died 1907)
 June 11 – Mariano Fortuny, painter (died 1874)
 June 24 – Jan Matejko, painter (died 1893)
 September 18 – Anton Mauve, painter (died 1888)
 November 18 – William Keith, painter (died 1911)
 November 28 – Alexander Opekushin, sculptor (died 1923)
 December 25 – Raffaello Sernesi, painter and medallist (died 1866)
 December 31 – Jules Dalou, sculptor (died 1902)

Deaths
 January 5 – Maria Cosway, Italian-English painter, engraver, composer, musician, and society hostess (born 1760)
 January 8 – Josef Grassi, Austrian painter especially of portraits (born 1757)
 February 28 – Charles Thévenin, neoclassical French painter, known for heroic scenes (born 1764)
 March 2 – Benjamin Barker, landscape painter (born 1776)
 March 29 – Carlo Lasinio, Italian engraver (born 1759)
 May 10 – José Aparicio, Spanish painter of the Neoclassic period (born 1773)
 June 4 – Claude Ramey, sculptor (born 1754)
 August 5 – Anton Schimser, Polish sculptor of Austrian origin (born 1790)
 September 5 – Charles Percier, architect and designer (born 1764)
 November 9 – Friedrich Carl Gröger, north-German portrait painter and lithographer (born 1766)
 November 29 – Erik Gustaf Göthe, Swedish sculptor (born 1779)
 date unknown – John O'Keeffe, Irish portrait and figure painter (born 1797)

References

 
Years of the 19th century in art
1830s in art